The Call was a publication of the British Socialist Party (BSP) which appeared in London from 24 February 1916 until 29 July 1920. Originally it was the voice of the British Socialist Party's anti-war faction, who succeeded in changing the BSP's earlier pro-war stance. After the Easter conference, 24-25 April 1916, it became the official publication of the BSP. The first editor was Fred Willis of Willesden, but Albert Inkpin subsequently took over the role.

Contributors
The Call published contributions from many notable writers:
 Dora Montefiore
 Walton Newbold
 Theodore Rothstein
 John MacLean

References

1916 establishments in the United Kingdom
1920 disestablishments in the United Kingdom
Defunct political magazines published in the United Kingdom
Magazines established in 1916
Magazines disestablished in 1920
Magazines published in London
Socialism in the United Kingdom
Socialist magazines